James B. Cross (December 17, 1819February 3, 1876) was an American lawyer and politician who served as the 9th mayor of Milwaukee, Wisconsin (1855–1858).  A Democrat, Cross also represented Milwaukee for three terms in the Wisconsin State Assembly, and was the Party's nominee for Governor of Wisconsin in the 1857 election.

Background and public office 
Cross was born in Phelps, New York, in 1819. In 1841, he moved to Milwaukee to practice law. Cross served as probate judge in 1848. He then served three terms as a member of the Wisconsin State Assembly in 1849, 1850, and 1855, representing Milwaukee County's First Assembly district.

Cross served for three terms as mayor of Milwaukee from April 1855 to April 1858. The Milwaukee Police Department came into being while Cross was mayor. Before this time, the Milwaukee County Sheriff and his deputy maintained law and order.  He was a Wisconsin delegate at the Democratic National Convention in Cincinnati, Ohio on June 2, 1856.

Run for governor 
Cross ran as the Democratic nominee for Governor of Wisconsin in 1857, but he was accused of financial maladministration during his terms as mayor; and his political association with former Governor (and fellow Democrat) William A. Barstow hindered his gubernatorial campaign. He lost to Republican Alexander Randall in a close vote, 44,239 to 44,693.

Life outside public office 
Cross was said to be deeply disappointed by the outcome of the gubernatorial election—though he came within 500 votes of victory—and mostly retired from political life afterwards. In his later years, Cross ran the Juneau National Bank from 1857 to 1862 and then worked in the liquor business from 1867 to 1876. Cross also worked at the post office, rising to head clerk by the time of his death.

He died of a stroke at his home on the morning of February 3, 1876.

Personal life and family
Cross was married twice.  He was married to Catherine Fuller in 1856, but she died less than a year later.  He subsequently married Eunice G. Osborn and had at least three children.  One of his children, James Jr., died in a drowning accident at age 8. He was survived by his second wife and two living children.

Electoral history

| colspan="6" style="text-align:center;background-color: #e9e9e9;"| General Election, November 3, 1857

References

Further reading

External links
 
 

1819 births
1876 deaths
Mayors of Milwaukee
Democratic Party members of the Wisconsin State Assembly
People from Phelps, New York
Postal officials
Wisconsin lawyers
Wisconsin state court judges
19th-century American politicians
19th-century American judges
19th-century American lawyers